"Sansoen Phra Barami" is the current royal anthem of Thailand. It was a de facto national anthem of Siam before 1932.

History 

The first song to be used as royal anthem and de facto national anthem of Siam/Thailand appeared in the reign of King Mongkut of Rattanakosin Kingdom. In 1851, two former British military officers named Captain Impey and Lieutenant Thomas George Knox served with the Siamese Army. They trained the troops of King Mongkut and the Second King Pinklao with British military tradition. So, they adopted the anthem "God Save the King" as honor music for the king of Siam. Phraya Srisunthonwohan (Noi Āchāryānkura) wrote Thai lyrics for this anthem later and named it as "Chom Rat Chong Charoen", which means "long live the great king".

In 1871, King Chulalongkorn visited Singapore and Batavia (now Jakarta) in the Dutch East Indies; it appeared that Siam used the same anthem with Great Britain, who ruled over Singapore at that time. It was necessary that Siam must have a new unique tune for using as the royal anthem and de facto national anthem. A group of Siamese traditional musicians had selected a Thai song named "Bulan Loi Luean" ("The Floating Moon on the Sky") which was the royal composition of King Buddha Loetla Nabhalai (Rama II) for use as the new anthem. King Chulalongkorn later ordered Mr.Heutsen, a Dutch bandmaster who served in the Royal Siamese Army, to arrange the song in western style for performing by the military band. According to a research of Sugree Charoensuk, an associate professor from Mahidol University, the melody of this anthem may be the same tune with another anthem named "Sansoen Sua Pa" which had been used as the anthem of the Wild Tiger Corps since 1911.

History about the royal anthem of Siam after 1871 are ambiguous, and evidence is rare to find. An evidence of music composition of the royal anthem of Siam appeared again in 1888 when a sheet music of the Siamese national anthem, arranged by the Russian composer Pyotr Schurovsky, was printed in Russia. The main melody of the song in that sheet music is the same tune of "Sansoen Phra Barami" in present time. According to a research of Sugree Charoensook, Pyotr Shchurovsky was the composer of the music of "Sansoen Phra Barami", to serve as Siam's national anthem. Prince Narisara Nuvadtivong later composed various lyrics of "Sansoen Phra Barami" for using in the Royal Siamese Army, in all Siamese school and in Siamese traditional music bands. Prince Abhakara Kiartivongse also composed a version of lyrics for used in the Royal Siamese Navy. In 1913, King Vajiravudh decided to relinquish all lyrics of "Sansoen Phra Barami" that mentioned before and revised it to current version only.

"Sansoen Phra Barami" was the de facto national anthem of Siam from 1888 until 1932, when it was replaced by "Phleng Chat Siam". It still use as the royal anthem of Thailand today.

In 1940, the Thai government under the administration of Prime Minister Plaek Phibunsongkhram issued the 8th Thai cultural mandate, concerning the lyrics of "Sansoen Phra Barami", which were shortened and the word "Siam" replaced with "Thai" (see below). After the end of World War II, these lyrics were quietly abandoned due its unpopularity, and reverted to the version that revised by King Vajiravudh in 1913.

The sound recording of "Sansoen Phra Barami" was recorded for the first time ever on the Edison wax cylinder by Carl Stumpf, an ethnomusicologist from the University of Berlin. In that recording, the anthem was performed by Boosra Mahin Theater Group, a Siamese theater group visiting Berlin in 1900.

Usage of the anthem 
The royal anthem is performed during state occasions, as well as when a high-ranking member of the royal family is present for a function. In addition, the royal anthem is still played before the beginning of each film in movie theatres, as well as before the commencement of the first act in plays, musicals, concerts, and most other live performances of music or theatre in Thailand. The anthem is also played at the sign-on and closedown of television and radio programming; for example, in 2008, 7HD aired a video with pictures of King Bhumibol Adulyadej from his birth to his 80th anniversaries in 2007. Radio Thailand (or NBT) also broadcast the sign-off with the anthem at 24:00 every night.

In 2019, the Royal Thai Government Gazette has published the Royal Office Regulation on Performing Honors Music of B.E. 2562. This regulation is detailed about using the royal anthem and other honors music for the king and members of the Thai royal family in several occasions. According to this regulation, The royal anthem "Sansoen Phra Barami" should be performed for the following:

 The King of Thailand
 Queen Sirikit the Queen Mother
 The Queen of Thailand
 Princess Maha Chakri Sirindhorn, the Princess Royal
 Heirs-apparent to the throne 
 Royal remains
 Some Thai Royal Standards when hoisted or shown:-
 Royal Standard of Thailand 
 Standard of Queen Sirikit the Queen Mother 
 Standard of the Queen of Thailand 
 Standard for Senior members of the Royal Family (Standard of the Princess Mother) 
 Standard of Princess Maha Chakri Sirindhorn, the Princess Royal
 Standard of the Crown Prince of Thailand

Lyrics 

The following are the current lyrics of "Sansoen Phra Barami", which was revised by King Vajiravudh in 1913.

Official lyrics

Lyrics used by the Royal Thai Army

Ancient drama lyrics

Male and female school lyrics

Male school lyrics

Female school lyrics

Lyrics adopted by the Royal Thai Navy

Abridged lyrics during World War II

Notes

References

External links 

 nationalanthems.info
 Recordings of Thai honors music from The Thai Government Public Relations Department
 Sign off video of PRD's Television of Thailand (Present NBT Digital 2HD)
 t-h-a-i-l-a-n-d.org - A website dedicated to Thai national culture and the Royal Anthem (Thai language)

Royal anthems
Historical national anthems
Thai monarchy
Thai songs
Asian anthems
National anthem compositions in E-flat major